The General's Daughter is a 2019 Philippine drama television series starring Angel Locsin, Albert Martinez, Janice de Belen, Eula Valdes, Paulo Avelino, Arjo Atayde, JC de Vera, Ryza Cenon, Tirso Cruz III, and Maricel Soriano. The series premiered on ABS-CBN's Primetime Bida evening block and worldwide via The Filipino Channel on January 21, 2019, replacing Ngayon at Kailanman. The series concluded on October 4, 2019 with a total of 183 episodes.

Series overview

Episodes

Season 1 (2019)

References

External links
 
 

General's Daughter